Henning Enoksen (26 September 1935 – 25 September 2016) was a Danish footballer, who most prominently won a silver medal with the Denmark national team at the 1960 Summer Olympics. He played a total of 54 national team games and scored 29 goals from 1958 to 1966, and also played for the Denmark U21 national team. Among other clubs, he played for Vejle Boldklub and AGF Aarhus in Denmark.

Honours
Vejle BK
 Danish 1st Division: 1958
 Danish Cup: 1957–58, 1958–59

Aarhus GF
 Danish Cup: 1964–65

Individual
 Danish 1st Division topscorer: 1958, 1960, 1966

References

External links

 Vejle Boldklub profile

1935 births
2016 deaths
Danish men's footballers
Association football forwards
Denmark under-21 international footballers
Denmark international footballers
Danish football managers
Silkeborg IF players
Vejle Boldklub players
Aarhus Gymnastikforening players
Footballers at the 1960 Summer Olympics
Olympic footballers of Denmark
Olympic silver medalists for Denmark
Iceland national football team managers
Olympic medalists in football
Medalists at the 1960 Summer Olympics
Danish expatriate football managers
Danish expatriate sportspeople in Iceland
Expatriate football managers in Iceland